Ibn Hajar may refer to:

Ibn Hajar al-Asqalani (1372–1449), Shafi'i and Hadith scholar
Ibn Hajar al-Haytami (1503–1566), Shafi'i scholar